The 1952 All-Ireland Senior Camogie Championship Final was the 21st All-Ireland Final and the deciding match of the 1952 All-Ireland Senior Camogie Championship, an inter-county camogie tournament for the top teams in Ireland.

Dublin won an exciting final by two points.

References

All-Ireland Senior Camogie Championship Final
All-Ireland Senior Camogie Championship Final
All-Ireland Senior Camogie Championship Final, 1952
All-Ireland Senior Camogie Championship Finals
Dublin county camogie team matches